Kola'a is a suburb of Honiara, Solomon Islands.

References

Populated places in Guadalcanal Province
Suburbs of Honiara